Dabra railway station is a railway station in Gwalior district, Madhya Pradesh. Its station code is DBA. It serves around 5 lakh people of Dabra city, Pichhore Bhitarwar, Takenpur BSF Academy and many other nearby smal towns and villages. The station consists of three platforms. The platforms are well sheltered. It has basic facilities of drinking water, sanitation and snacks, retiring room, reservation counter. With over 54 trains making halts, it has good connectivity to east, west, North and South India.

Major trains 
 Malwa Express
 Lashkar Express
 Patalkot Express
 Mahakoshal Express
 Chhattisgarh Express
 Khajuraho–Udaipur City Express
 Patalkot Express
 Bundelkhand Express
 Jhelum Express
 Kalinga Utkal Express
 Panchvalley Passenger
 Barauni–Gwalior Mail
 Jhansi–Bandra Terminus Express
 Agra–Jhansi Passenger (unreserved)
 Chambal Express
 Punjab Mail
 Chambal Express
 Taj Express
 Sachkhand Express
 Gondwana Express
 Jhansi–Etawah Link Express
 Jhansi–Bandra Terminus Express
 Jhansi–Etawah Link Express
 Jhansi–Indore Link Express
 Dakshin Express

References

Railway stations in Gwalior district
Jhansi railway division